Tirukkoyilur taluk is a taluk of  Kallakurichi district  of the Indian state of Tamil Nadu. The headquarters of the taluk is the town of Tirukkoyilur.

Demographics
According to the 2011 census, the taluk of Tirukkoyilur had a population of 438,254 with 222,295 males and 215,959 females. There were 971 women for every 1,000 men. The taluk had a literacy rate of 61.02%. Child population in the age group below 6 years were 27,019 Males and 25,166 Females.

References 

Taluks of Kallakurichi district